Sia was a town of ancient Pisidia inhabited during Hellenistic, Roman, and Byzantine times.

Its site is located near Karaot, in Asiatic Turkey.

References

Populated places in Pisidia
Former populated places in Turkey
Roman towns and cities in Turkey
Populated places of the Byzantine Empire
History of Burdur Province